Thomas Childers Jr. (born 1946) is an American historian and lecturer. He was hired by the University of Pennsylvania in 1976 and in 2017 as Professor Emeritus.

Childers was born and raised in Cleveland, Tennessee. He later attended the University of Tennessee where he received his bachelor's and master's degrees. He gained his PH.D. in History in 1976 from Harvard University. Much of Childers work focuses on war and society in the twentieth century, particularly World War I and II. His father and uncle both fought in World War II; his uncle was killed in action, and although Childers's father survived, the family still struggled to reunite after his return. This greatly impacted his childhood and influenced his 2009 book about the experiences of American veterans after the war, Soldier from the War Returning: The Greatest Generation's Troubled Homecoming from World War II.

He has received several teaching awards including the Ira T. Abrahms Award in 1987 for Distinguish Teaching and Challenging Teaching in the Arts and Sciences, and the Richard S. Dunn Award for Distinguished Teaching in History. While teaching at the University of Pennsylvania Dr. Childers has taken many Visiting Professorships at well-known colleges such as the University of Cambridge, Swarthmore College, and Trinity Hall College. He has also done many lectures throughout the world in places like Oxford, Berlin, Munich, and London. Dr. Childers's work has been talked about by other historians. Some of those acknowledgements can be found in the book Historiography in the Twentieth Century from Scientific Objectivity to the Postmodern Challenge written by Georg G. Iggers. For example, Iggers states "Thomas Childers concentrates more directly on language." (Iggers 1997)

Childers has lectured on four of The Great Courses series. , he lives in Media, Pennsylvania.

Publications
'The Nazi Voter (Chapel Hill, 1983)
The Formation of the Nazi Constituency, 1919-1933 (1986)
Reevaluating the Third Reich (Europe Past and Present) (1993)
Wings of Morning: The story of the last American bomber shot down over Germany in World War II (Reading, Mass. 1996)
Europe and Western Civilization in the Modern Age [sound recording] (2000)
History of Hitler's Empire [sound recording]
World War II: A Military and Social History [sound recording] 
36 Revolutionary Figures in History:  Hitler's Foreign Policy [sound recording]
In the Shadows of War: An American Pilot's Odyssey through Occupied France and the Camps of Nazi Germany (2003)
Soldier from the War Returning: The Greatest Generation's Troubled Homecoming from World War II (May, 2009)
The Third Reich: A History of Nazi Germany (October, 2017)

Sources 

Iggers, Georg G. Historiography in the Twentieth Century from Scientific Objectivity to the Postmodern Challenge. Hanover: University Press of New England, 1997.
The Century: Ultimate Power. Directed by Kenneth Levis. Performed by Thomas Childers and Peter Jenning. 1999.
University Of Pennsylvania Websites http://www.upenn.edu/
Arizona State Libraries http://lib.asu.edu/
Childers, Thomas, interview by CB. Professional Life Story (May 1, 2009).

External links 
 

1946 births
Living people
20th-century American historians
21st-century American historians
Harvard Graduate School of Arts and Sciences alumni
Historians from Tennessee
People from Cleveland, Tennessee
People from Media, Pennsylvania
University of Pennsylvania faculty
University of Pennsylvania historian
University of Tennessee alumni